Lauren Harry Cohen is an American financial economist who is the L.E. Simmons Professor in the Finance & Entrepreneurial Management Units at Harvard University's Business School. He was a nationally ranked powerlifting champion.  He was previously an assistant professor at Yale University's School of Management.

Early life and education
Cohen is the son of an orthopedic surgeon and a nurse. He was raised in the village of Waverly of Tioga County, New York. There he was a tuba player in the high school marching band, captain of the gridiron football team and class valedictorian at Waverly High School. Cohen was an undergraduate student at the University of Pennsylvania's Wharton School  and graduated with both an M.B.A. and a Ph.D. from the University of Chicago Graduate School of Business in 2005.

Career
In 2005, Lauren accepted a position at the Yale University School of Management as an assistant professor.  He taught finance at Yale from 2005 to 2007 after which he moved to accept a position at the Harvard Business School, where he became an associate professor in 2011, a full professor in 2014, and a chaired professor in 2015 achieved tenure in 8 years at age 35.

Cohen's specialty is behavioral finance. His expertise has been relied upon as an industry consultant, government advisor and as an expert witness. Cohen won the Smith Breeden Prize as one of the best three papers in the Journal of Finance (along with Karl Diether and Christopher Malloy) for his October 2007 edition publication "Supply and Demand Shifts in the Shorting Market."  He again received Smith Breeden recognition for "Economic Links and Predictable Returns" (with Andrea Frazzini) from the August 2008 Journal of Finance and "Sell Side School Ties" (with Christopher J. Malloy, and Andrea Frazzini) from August 2010 Journal of Finance. Cohen was also awarded a National Science Foundation CAREER grant.

Powerlifting
He placed second at the 2003 Junior Nationals.

Personal
Cohen is Jewish. He was raised in a kosher home and raises six children in a kosher home in Belmont, Massachusetts with his wife, Nicole Cohen.

References

External links
Harvard Business School page
Powerlifting career statistics page

1979 births
20th-century American Jews
21st-century American economists
21st-century American Jews
Behavioral economists
Economists from New York (state)
Financial economists
Harvard Business School faculty
Living people
People from Waverly, Tioga County, New York
American powerlifters
University of Chicago Booth School of Business alumni
Wharton School of the University of Pennsylvania alumni
Yale School of Management faculty